A bitstream format is the format of the data found in a stream of bits used in a digital communication or data storage application.  The term typically refers to the data format of the output of an encoder, or the data format of the input to a decoder when using data compression.

Processing 

Standardized interoperability specifications such as the video coding standards produced by the MPEG and the ITU-T, and the audio coding standards produced by the MPEG, often specify only the bitstream format and the decoding process. This allows encoder implementations to use any methods whatsoever that produce bitstreams which conform to the specified bitstream format.

Normally, decoding of a bitstream can be initiated without having to start from the beginning of a file, or the beginning of the data transmission. Some bitstreams are designed for this to occur, for example by using indexes or key frames.

Uses of bit stream decoders (BSD):
 Graphics processing unit (GPU)
 H.264/MPEG-4 AVC
 Unified Video Decoder (UVD) the video decoding bit-stream technology from ATI Technologies/AMD
 PureVideo the video decoding bit-stream technology from Nvidia
 Quick Sync Video the video decoding and encoding bit-stream technology from Intel

See also
 Elementary stream
 Stream processing

References

Data compression